Embers is a 2015 American independent science fiction film directed by Claire Carré as her feature debut, and written and produced by Claire Carré and Charles Spano. It features Jason Ritter, Iva Gocheva, Greta Fernández, Tucker Smallwood, Karl Glusman, and Silvan Friedman.

The film world premiered at Oldenburg International Film Festival and US co-premiered at the Chicago International Film Festival and New Orleans Film Festival where it won Best Feature. Embers was selected as Closing Night Film at Slamdance Film Festival. Slamdance Presents acquired theatrical rights and The Orchard acquired global digital distribution rights to the film, releasing it in 2016.

Plot 
Embers tells the story of those who, a decade after a global epidemic, remain and suffer from lasting effects of the virus - retrograde and anterograde amnesia. The survivors navigate a decaying landscape, unable to recall the past or create new memories. Five interwoven stories each explore a different facet of life without memory in a future that has no past.

Cast 
 Jason Ritter as Guy
 Iva Gocheva as Girl
 Greta Fernández as Miranda
 Tucker Smallwood as Teacher
 Karl Glusman as Chaos
 Roberto Cots as Father
 Dominique Swain as Woman in the Long Dress
 Matthew Goulish as Guardian
 Silvan Ftiedman as Boy
 Sundance as Horse

Reception

Critical response 
Embers received wide critical acclaim including positive reviews in The Hollywood Reporter, Los Angeles Times, and L.A. Weekly. Eric Kohn of IndieWire dubbed Embers, "the best science fiction discovery of the year," and Don Simpson writing for Smells Like Screen Spirit called Embers, "one of the most memorable independent science fiction films in the last decade.” Sight & Sound's Anton Bitel lauded the direction, saying, "Carré weaves from her ensemble amnesi-apocalypse a reflection of the human condition as philosophically compelling as it is emotionally intelligent." The Italian film journal Cine Lapsus described the film as, "Beckett absurdly suspended halfway between Memento and City Lights.” Variety criticized Embers, saying it "could be described as a mass-scale Memento, but that thumbnail sketch misses both the pic's impressive conceptual breadth and its numbing dramatic stasis."

Accolades 
Director Claire Carré received nominations for the Someone to Watch Award at the 2017 Independent Spirit Awards and the Spotlight On Women Directors Award at the Gotham Awards. Embers was nominated for Best Production Design for Chelsea Oliver at the inaugural American Independent Film Awards.

Embers received numerous festival accolades including Best Feature at New Orleans Film Festival, SciFi London, Feratum Film Festival, and Oxford Film Festival, where Carré also was given the Alice Guy-Blaché Award. At Newport Beach Film Festival, Embers won both Best Feature and Best Director, and the film received awards for Best Feature and Best Editing at Buenos Aires Rojo Sangre Film Festival. Embers also received Best New Director at Brooklyn Film Festival, and both the Juice Award and Special Jury Prize at Sarasota Film Festival. Trieste Science+Fiction Festival in Italy awarded Embers the prestigious Asteroide.

References

External links 
 Embers Official Website
 
 Embers at Rotten Tomatoes
 Embers Trailer at YouTube

2015 films
2015 science fiction films
2015 directorial debut films
Films about viral outbreaks
American science fiction films
2010s English-language films
2010s American films